In enzymology, a deoxyhypusine monooxygenase is an enzyme that catalyzes the chemical reaction

protein N6-(4-aminobutyl)-L-lysine + AH2 + O2  protein N6-[(R)-4-amino-2-hydroxybutyl]-L-lysine + A + H2O

The 3 substrates of this enzyme are a protein-bound N6-(4-aminobutyl)-L-lysine, an electron acceptor AH2, and O2, and its 3 products are protein-bound N6-[(R)-4-amino-2-hydroxybutyl]-L-lysine, the reduction product A, and H2O.

This enzyme belongs to the family of oxidoreductases, specifically those acting on paired donors, with O2 as oxidant and incorporation or reduction of oxygen. The oxygen incorporated need not be derive from O miscellaneous.  The systematic name of this enzyme class is deoxyhypusine,hydrogen-donor:oxygen oxidoreductase (2-hydroxylating). Other names in common use include deoxyhypusine hydroxylase, and deoxyhypusine dioxygenase.

Mammalian proteins
The HUGO symbol for human gene and protein is DOHH, the full name is deoxyhypusine hydroxylase, and there are orthologs in other mammals. The orthologs have the same symbol, except for rodents, there the symbol is Dohh. The difference in case is just a meaningless historical artifact.

References

 

EC 1.14.99
Enzymes of unknown structure